State Highway 49 (SH 49) is a State Highway in Kerala, India that starts in Guruvayoor and ends in Choondal. The highway is 7.275 km long. It is one of the shortest state highways in Kerala. It is one of the three ways which connect Guruvayoor with Thrissur city.

The Route Map 
Guruvayoor – Chowallurpady - Choondal

See also 
Roads in Kerala
List of State Highways in Kerala

References 

State Highways in Kerala
Roads in Thrissur district
Transport in Guruvayur